Musarrat Shaheen is a Pakistani actress-turned-politician from Khyber Pakhtunkhwa. She was a noted actress in Pashto cinema. She is the chairwoman of the Pakistan Tehreek-e-Masawat.

Career 
She worked in at least 400 Pashto films. She has also worked in numerous Urdu films, dramas and other projects. Her famous films include Haseena Atom Bomb,  Aawara and Dhamki.

In 2000, Musarrat formed her own political party Pakistan Tehreek-e-Masawat (PTM). Although she has not achieved any success in politics, but she contests against Fazal-ur-Rehman in every election.

References

External links 
 

Living people
Pakistani actor-politicians
Politicians from Khyber Pakhtunkhwa
People from Dera Ismail Khan District
Year of birth missing (living people)
Pakistani television actresses
Actresses in Pashto cinema
20th-century Pakistani actresses
Actresses in Urdu cinema
21st-century Pakistani actresses
Actresses in Punjabi cinema
Pakistani film actresses